Richard Dupuis (born September 2, 1942) is a former professional Canadian football player in the Canadian Football League (CFL). 

Dupuis played college football at the University of Notre Dame.

He played defensive back for the Calgary Stampeders for three years before joining Edmonton and playing 9 years for the Edmonton Eskimos from 1965 to 1976.  He won two West All-Star selections at defensive back while with Edmonton (1971 and 1972) and one CFL All-Star in 1971.

References

1942 births
Living people
Calgary Stampeders players
Canadian football defensive backs
American football defensive backs
Canadian players of American football
Edmonton Elks players
Franco-Albertan people
Notre Dame Fighting Irish football players
Players of Canadian football from Alberta
Canadian football people from Edmonton